is a former Japanese football coach and former player who last coached Gamba Osaka. He played for Japan national team.

A central defender, Miyamoto went on to make 71 international appearances and led the Japan national team in the 2002 and 2006 World Cups as well as the 2004 Asian Cup. Miyamoto also captained Gamba Osaka during their 2005 J1 League championship season.

He is also a graduate of the 13th edition of FIFA Master.

Club career
Miyamoto was born in Tondabayashi on 7 February 1977. He joined Gamba Osaka from youth team in 1995. He also continued to study at Doshisha University well into his professional career, graduating and finishing his studies. Miyamoto speaks fluent English, with a little French also in his canon, after spending time with Gamba teammates Claude Dambury and Patrick M'Boma in the past, as well as coach Frédéric Antonetti. While in Austria, he studied German.

Initially, Miyamoto had few opportunities to play as defender, he also played defensive midfielder. From late 1990s, he played as central defender. While he was the de facto team captain of Gamba Osaka in 2004, Gamba's coach was unhappy at the time spent with the national team by Miyamoto and handed the captaincy of Gamba to Satoshi Yamaguchi. Miyamoto continued to captain Japan for a while, ironically, often sitting on the bench for Gamba Osaka. But his professionalism shone through, and he took it all in stride. In 2005, the club won 2005 J1 League. With Ivica Osim taking over the national team from Zico in 2006, Japan saw a clean sweep and Miyamoto was one of many who had probably played his last game for the Japan national team.

In December 2006, Miyamoto signed for 1 season with Red Bull Salzburg with an option for another season. In December 2007, he signed a new deal with the Austrian club through 2009.

On, 15 January 2009, he signed for Vissel Kobe. In 2009, he became a captain and played as center-back and defensive midfielder. However his opportunity to play decreased from 2010. On 19 December 2011, Vissel Kobe centre-back Tsuneyasu Miyamoto confirmed his retirement in a press conference on Monday afternoon in Kobe, Japan.

International career
Miyamoto played for Japan U17 national team in the 1993 U-17 World Championship and Japan U20 national team in the 1997 World Youth Championship. He played full-time in all matches in both tournaments. In September 2000, he was also selected Japan U23 national team for 2000 Summer Olympics.

On 18 June 2000, Miyamoto debuted for Japan national team against Bolivia. As a centre back, he served as captain for Japan in the 2002 World Cup, after an injury to Ryuzo Morioka, who had begun the tournament as captain. He then continued to captain his country through the 2004 Asian Cup and the 2006 World Cup. At 2004 Asian Cup, he played full-time in all six matches and Japan won the champions. At 2006 World Cup, he played the first two group matches of the cup, but was suspended for the third and last match against Brazil after he received yellow cards against Australia and Croatia. Yuji Nakazawa wore the armband in his place. This competition was his last game for Japan. He played 71 games and scored 3 goals for Japan until 2006.

Coaching career
After retirement, Miyamoto started coaching career at Gamba Osaka in 2015. He became a manager for Gamba Osaka U-23 in 2017. On 23 July 2018, top team manager Levir Culpi was sacked when the club was at the 16th place of 18 clubs. Miyamoto was named new manager as Culpi successor. On 14 May 2021, Miyamoto was sacked by Gamba Osaka after the form of the 2008 AFC Champions League winners dipped markedly this season, recording one win in the first 10 games during which Gamba scored just three goals to leave the club in 18th place in the 20-team division.  Miyamoto raised Gamba to the 9th place in 2018 season.

Career statistics

Club

International

Managerial statistics
Update; 14 May 2021

Honors
Gamba Osaka
 J1 League: 2005

Red Bull Salzburg
 Austrian Bundesliga: 2007; runner-up: 2008

Japan
 AFC Asian Cup: 2004

Individual
 AFC Asian Cup Best Eleven: 2004
 J.League Manager of the Year: 2020

References

External links
 
 
 Japan National Football Team Database
 
 

1977 births
Living people
Doshisha University alumni
Association football people from Osaka Prefecture
Japanese footballers
Japan international footballers
Japan youth international footballers
J1 League players
Austrian Football Bundesliga players
Gamba Osaka players
FC Red Bull Salzburg players
Vissel Kobe players
Footballers at the 1998 Asian Games
Asian Games competitors for Japan
Footballers at the 2000 Summer Olympics
Olympic footballers of Japan
2002 FIFA World Cup players
2003 FIFA Confederations Cup players
2004 AFC Asian Cup players
2005 FIFA Confederations Cup players
2006 FIFA World Cup players
AFC Asian Cup-winning players
Japanese expatriate footballers
Expatriate footballers in Austria
Japanese expatriate sportspeople in Austria
Japanese football managers
J1 League managers
J3 League managers
Gamba Osaka U-23 managers
Gamba Osaka managers
People from Tondabayashi, Osaka
Association football defenders
FIFA Master alumni